Moosomin 112L is an Indian reserve of the Moosomin First Nation in Saskatchewan. It is 27 kilometres northwest of Blaine Lake.

References

Indian reserves in Saskatchewan